Proeutropiichthys is a genus of schilbid catfishes native to Asia.

Species
There are currently three recognized species in this genus:
 Proeutropiichthys buchanani (Valenciennes, 1840)
 Proeutropiichthys macropthalmos (Blyth, 1860)
 Proeutropiichthys taakree (Sykes, 1839)

References

Schilbeidae
Fish of Asia
Freshwater fish genera
Catfish genera
Taxa named by Sunder Lal Hora